Taylor Reed (born August 7, 1991) is a gridiron football linebacker who is currently a free agent. He played college football at Southern Methodist University. He has also been a member of the Dallas Cowboys, Winnipeg Blue Bombers, New England Patriots, Hamilton Tiger-Cats, Calgary Stampeders, Ottawa Redblacks, Toronto Argonauts, and Houston Roughnecks.

Early years
Reed played high school football for the West Brook Senior High School  Bruins of Beaumont, Texas and earned all-district honors.

College career
Reed played in 52 games for the SMU Mustangs from 2009 to 2012, recording 400 total tackles. He was named second-team All-Conference USA in 2011 and 2012, honorable mention All-Conference USA in 2010 and All-Freshman Conference USA in 2009.

Professional career

Dallas Cowboys
Reed was signed by the Dallas Cowboys of the National Football League (NFL) on May 10, 2013 after going undrafted in the 2013 NFL Draft. He was released by the Cowboys on August 30, 2013.

Winnipeg Blue Bombers
On October 2, 2013, Reed was signed to the practice squad of the Winnipeg Blue Bombers of the CFL.

Dallas Cowboys (II)
Reed was signed to the Dallas Cowboys practice squad on November 18, 2013. He was released by the Cowboys on November 26, 2013.

New England Patriots
On December 30, 2013, Reed was signed to the practice squad of the New England Patriots of the NFL. He was signed to a futures contract by the Patriots on January 20, 2014. He was released by the Patriots on March 10, 2014.

Hamilton Tiger-Cats
Reed was signed by the Hamilton Tiger-Cats of the Canadian Football League on June 27, 2014. He was named Defensive Player of the Week for week twelve of the 2014 CFL season after recording six defensive tackles, one tackle for a loss, one special teams tackle and one quarterback sack. In two seasons with the Tiger-Cats Reed played in 33 games contributing 141 defensive tackles, 7 special teams tackles, 10 sacks, 3 forced fumbles and 2 interceptions.

Calgary Stampeders
As a free agent Reed signed with the Calgary Stampeders of the CFL on February 10, 2016. He was released by the Stampeders on September 12, 2016. Prior to being released he had played in all 10 games to start the 2016 season, contributing 41 tackles, 2 sacks and 1 forced fumble. The reason for his release was the exceptional play of national linebacker Alex Singleton.

Ottawa Redblacks
Reed was signed by the Ottawa Redblacks of the CFL on September 13, 2016; only one day after being let go by Calgary. He played in all 8 of the remaining regular season games for Ottawa, and their two playoff games. During the 2016 season with Ottawa he accumulated 39 tackles and 1 quarterback sack. He set a career-high 12 tackles against Winnipeg on October 29. Reed helped lead Ottawa's defense to a championship in the 104th Grey Cup game versus his former team, the Calgary Stampeders, with a final score of 39-33 in overtime. On January 10, 2017 the Redblacks confirmed they had signed Taylor Reed to a one-year extension. Reed would have become a free agent on February 14, 2017. In his second season with the Redblacks Reed set a new career high with 94 tackles in 18 games: He also had four sacks. Following the season he was not re-signed by the Redblacks and became a free agent on February 13, 2018.

Toronto Argonauts
After being on the open market for a week Reed and the Toronto Argonauts agreed to a one-year contract on February 20, 2018. On August 15, 2018, Reed was released by the Argonauts.

Houston Roughnecks
In October 2019, Reed was picked by the Houston Roughnecks in the open phase of the 2020 XFL Draft.

References

External links
College stats
Hamilton Tiger-Cats bio 
SMU Mustangs profile

Living people
1991 births
American football linebackers
Canadian football linebackers
African-American players of American football
African-American players of Canadian football
SMU Mustangs football players
Dallas Cowboys players
Winnipeg Blue Bombers players
New England Patriots players
Hamilton Tiger-Cats players
Calgary Stampeders players
Ottawa Redblacks players
Players of American football from Texas
Sportspeople from Beaumont, Texas
Toronto Argonauts players
Edmonton Elks players
Houston Roughnecks players
21st-century African-American sportspeople